In probability theory, Kolmogorov equations, including Kolmogorov forward equations and Kolmogorov backward equations, characterize continuous-time Markov processes. In particular, they describe how the probability that a continuous-time Markov process is in a certain state changes over time.

Diffusion processes vs. jump processes

Writing in 1931, Andrei Kolmogorov started from the theory of discrete time Markov processes, which are described by the Chapman–Kolmogorov equation, and sought to derive a theory of continuous time Markov processes by extending this equation.  He found that there are two kinds of continuous time Markov processes, depending on the assumed behavior over small intervals of time:

If you assume that "in a small time interval there is an overwhelming probability that the state will remain unchanged; however, if it changes, the change may be radical", then you are led to what are called jump processes.

The other case leads to processes such as those "represented by diffusion and by Brownian motion; there it is certain that some change will occur in any time interval, however small; only, here it is certain that the changes during small time intervals will be also small".

For each of these two kinds of processes, Kolmogorov derived a forward and a backward system of equations (four in all).

History

The equations are named after Andrei Kolmogorov since they were highlighted in his 1931 foundational work.

William Feller, in 1949, used the names "forward equation" and "backward equation" for his more general version of the Kolmogorov's pair,
in both jump and diffusion processes. Much later, in 1956, he referred to the equations for the jump process as "Kolmogorov forward equations" and "Kolmogorov backward equations".

Other authors, such as Motoo Kimura, referred to the diffusion (Fokker–Planck) equation as Kolmogorov forward equation, a name that has persisted.

The modern view

In the context of a continuous-time Markov process with jumps, see Kolmogorov equations (Markov jump process). In particular, in natural sciences the forward equation is also known as master equation.
In the context of a diffusion process, for the backward Kolmogorov equations see Kolmogorov backward equations (diffusion). The forward Kolmogorov equation is also known as Fokker–Planck equation.

An example from biology

One example from biology is given below:

 

This equation is applied to model population growth with birth. Where  is the population index, with reference the initial population,  is the birth rate, and finally , i.e. the probability of achieving a certain population size.

The analytical solution is:

 

This is a formula for the density  in terms of the preceding ones, i.e. .

References 

Markov processes
Stochastic models
Mathematical and theoretical biology
Population models